is a Japanese manga series by Yumi Nakata. It began serialization in Ichijinsha's shōnen manga magazine Comic Rex and ran from 2011 to 2018 and collected in thirteen tankōbon volumes. The story originally started in 2007 as a hentai manga called , which published in a single tankōbon volume by Jitsugyo no Nihon Sha, Ltd. in 2007. An anime television series adaptation by Seven aired from July to September 2015. A second season aired from October 2 to December 18, 2016.

Plot
Hayato Izumi runs for student council president at his new high school but loses to Ui Wakana, a perky and charismatic girl who pledges to liberate love on campus and throws condoms into the audience during her election speech. He ends up becoming the vice-president of the student council. He soon learns that due to an arrangement by their parents, Ui becomes his fiancée, and they have to live together. 

He tries to keep their cohabitation a secret from the school and its all-female student council leadership while fending off Ui's progressively aggressive romantic and sexual advances at home. Ui's personality and her actions put her in direct conflict with the discipline committee. Rin Misumi, the head of the committee, frequently comes into conflict with the student council. Hayato starts attracting the discipline head's attention through various meetings and coincidences, who later moves in next door with her sister Kei, the school's nurse.

As the school year progresses, Rin takes a progressively leading role, with her conflict as the discipline chair and her feeling towards Hayato taking center stage, often overshadowing the series' title character.

Characters

Ui becomes the student council president following her campaign to spread love over the school where she passed out condoms. She moves into Hayato's apartment as his fiancee in an arranged marriage. She is noticeably less serious at "home," where she cannot cook for herself, often slacks off, and completely acts dependent on Hayato. A running gag in the series is that baby chicks appear on the top of her head whenever she gets in a depressed or pensive mood. Throughout the series, she tries to please Hayato romantically and even sexually, knowing very little about doing it properly. Once Rin appears and becomes a recurring character, she develops an inferiority complex around her breasts, making her wish her figure was more like Rin.

Hayato is a serious individual who is the vice-president of the student council. He is set up with Ui Wakana in an arranged marriage and must live with her in his apartment. Despite his ever-growing respect for Ui throughout the series, he often gets caught in her romantic advances. It makes him uncomfortable yet aroused. Hayato is notably self-sufficient, having cooked and cleaned for himself before Ui's arrival. He is impulsive and doesn't think things through, so he gets caught up with many other sexual situations with the rest of the female cast, especially Rin. He develops a fetish for huge breasts after being in constant contact with Rin, much to the chagrin of Ui. Throughout the series, he dithers between his relationship with Ui, and his fascination with Rin's body, providing a principal source of conflict among the female cast.

 (anime), Yuki Horinaka (drama CD)
The student council secretary. She likes to dress up in frilly outfits and cat ears. She is a bit spacey and absent-minded.

 (anime), Asami Shimoda (drama CD)
The student council treasurer. She is petite and is very devoted to Ui, harboring a perverted interest in her. She dislikes Hayato and often comes in conflict with him.

 (anime), Yuri Komagata (drama CD)
The head of the disciplinary committee, Rin dislikes Ui's love campaign and its related antics; however, she develops feelings for Hayato after he treats her nicely and helps her in a situation. She and her sister move in next door to Hayato. Before the summer festival, Rin accidentally reveals that she wore a bra that made her breasts look smaller because she was self-conscious of the attention the guys gave to them. Rin later learns of Hayato and Ui's cohabitation from her sister that causes her to become extremely jealous. In the anime, Rin explains that she joined the committee because she wanted to disavow a rumor that she was seducing guys with her huge breasts by emphasizing her morally pure side. The manga later reveals that Rin was a childhood friend of Ui and Hayato, and the plot point never gets brought up again. The second season of the anime also alluded to this plot point in the opening, and like the manga, it never gets developed further. Ikoma states that Rin is enormously popular among the incoming freshman class because of her kindness and sense of style. In the second year of high school, Rin becomes part of the same class as the cast.
Rin Misumi's enormous popularity in Japan and abroad led her to become a focal point in the manga, often overshadowing Ui and sidelining her. The anime adaptation cut several manga scenes and story arcs that prominently featured Rin. The imagery and original art of this character still play a leading role in the marketing of the series; long after completion.

A petite girl who looks after Rin like Karen does with Ui. She has a collection of pictures of Rin in embarrassing situations. While she does many perverted actions towards Rin, she genuinely cares for her as a friend and confidante.

Misato is Ui's energetic and playful mother. Her petite stature makes everyone think she is Ui's little sister.

 
Rin's sister is the school nurse who casually dresses in sexually suggestive clothing and whose behaviors annoy Rin. She and Rin move into the apartment next door to Hayato. She later learns of their cohabitation from Ui's parents and keeps it a secret from Rin,  but later accidentally reveals it to her. She teases Hayato when she noticed his gaze and divulges that Rin is larger. While she support's her sister's love, she also uses it as a source of teasing and amusement. According to the behind-the-scenes planning included in the manga, Rin was originally going to have a brother. This plan changed before publication to become Kei Misumi.

 
Ui's father whose youthful appearance makes him look more like her little brother. He is severe and strict, although when he is pensive, little rats appear atop his head much like his daughter with the baby chicks.

President of the Photography club. She is cheerful and energetic and is constantly looking out for any good photo opportunities that cause her to regularly contact the disciplinary committee and/or the student council. Her photography club runs an underground website that sells voyeuristic pictures of the school's female students online. They use the club's all-female members to take candid photos of other students or set up hidden cameras in the toilets and changing rooms. Honoka later reveals that some pictures were faked by using the club's members as models and then editing other students' faces. The student council destroys the SD card that contains all their racy files of the female students. Ui puts Honoka on the right path by making her the official festival photographer after Ui and Rin's (forced) approval. Honoka starts developing talent and skill for photography, yet she still needs Rin to reign her perverted tendencies.

Kenta Ikoma
A younger male student who has a crush on Ui Wakana, introduced at the end of volume 6, was never animated in the two seasons of the anime series. He confesses to Ui constantly and gets rejected swiftly. Upon getting into high school, he joins the student council. After continuous rejections, he starts to fall for Makoto and Ayane.

Media

Manga
The series compiled into thirteen tankōbon volumes between January 2012 and November 2018. This series was a major success for the publisher and the manga artist, selling 1 million copies by volume 11. On February 25, 2018, the publisher announced that the series would end in the 13th volume.

Anime
An anime adaptation directed by Hiroyuki Furukawa and produced by Seven aired in Japan on the broadcast night of July 1 to September 17, 2015. The show was streamed online with English subtitles on Crunchyroll. An OVA was bundled with the manga's 9th volume on January 27, 2016. It was announced in the March 2016 issue of the Monthly Comic Rex magazine that a second season of the anime was green-lit. The second season aired from October 2 to December 18, 2016. Media Blasters announced that they acquired the franchise for USA release on March 25, 2016. After that, they did not do any further announcements, and it is safe to assume that the series will never get a physical domestic USA release.

Episode list

Season 1

Season 2

Reception
Chris Beveridge of The Fandom Post gave the first anime episode a B+ and said "I’ll admit that the concept is familiar and at the same time goofy, but there’s a certain quality about it that’s charming, sexy and has the potential to be a hell of a lot of fun." He give later episodes B's, writing that "the show does feel like it’s trying to be a bit educational though it tends to fall more on the whole titillation side more than anything else." In his review of episode 9, he wrote that "the show takes things further than reality would in a lot of ways, there’s a lot of fun in just having characters that actually acknowledge some form of sexuality that exists." and summarized the series as "Silly and serious but with a great dose of a fanservice, this show is just a delight to watch." In reviewing the final episode, he wrote "It does things that most shows are afraid to even think of, never mind even trying a fraction of doing when it comes to character relationships, intimacy, and sexuality."

Notes and references

Notes
 "Ch." is shortened form for chapter and refers to a chapter number of the My Wife Is the Student Council President manga
 "Ep." is shortened form for episode and refers to an episode number of the My Wife Is the Student Council President anime

Japanese

References

External links
Official website 
Official anime website 

2015 anime television series debuts
Anime series based on manga
AT-X (TV network) original programming
Ichijinsha manga
Seven (animation studio)
Sex comedy anime and manga
Shōnen manga